Tenitra Michelle Williams (born July 23, 1979) is an American singer, songwriter, and actress. She rose to fame in the 2000s as a member of R&B girl group Destiny's Child, one of the best-selling female groups of all time with over 60 million records, of which more than 35 million copies sold with the trio lineup that included Williams. During her time in the group she earned several accolades including a Grammy Award and star on the Hollywood Walk of Fame.

During the group's two-year hiatus, 2001–2003, Williams released her debut solo album Heart to Yours (2002) which topped the US gospel album chart and became the best-selling gospel release of the year. That same year, Billboard named Williams the fifth best-charting gospel artist of the year and she received a MOBO Award for "Best Gospel Act". Following this, she released her second solo album Do You Know (2004). After Destiny's Child's disbandment in 2006, Williams released her first pop album, Unexpected (2008), which spawned the singles "We Break the Dawn" and the US Dance number-one "The Greatest". Her fourth studio album, Journey to Freedom (2014), received positive reviews and became her highest-charting album in the US; it includes the singles "If We Had Your Eyes", and "Say Yes" which topped the US Hot Gospel Songs chart for seven weeks, and won the Stellar Award for Music Video of the Year.

Williams has found success as a television, Broadway and West End theatre actress, gaining a nomination for "Best Lead Female – Equity" in 2008 at the 18th Annual NAACP Theatre Awards. Making her acting debut on Broadway in Aida (2003), she has since starred in the sitcom series Half & Half (2006) and the musical productions The Color Purple (2007), Chicago (2009–10), What My Husband Doesn't Know (2011) and Fela! (2013). She was a featured judge on MTV's Top Pop Group, a contestant on season 8 of Strictly Come Dancing in the United Kingdom, and starred in the Oxygen reality television series Fix My Choir. She has also appeared on the   American, British, and Australian versions of The Masked Singer.

Life and career

1979–1999: Early life 
Tenitra Michelle Williams was born in Rockford, Illinois, on July 23, 1979, to Anita Williams (née Washington) and Dennis Williams III (1952–2020). She has three siblings: elder brother Erron, who is also a musician, elder sister Cameron, and younger sister Danielle. Williams made her musical debut at the age of seven, performing a rendition of the hymn "Blessed Assurance" at the St. Paul Church of God in Christ. She later sang in the gospel groups United Harmony and Chosen Expression.

Williams graduated from Rockford Auburn High School in 1997. Shortly after graduating, she pursued a degree in criminal justice at Illinois State University, doubtful of her ability to make a career as a professional singer. However, after two years of college, she left to pursue a music career, as a backing vocalist for other artists such as Monica. In late 1999, 20-year-old Williams met Destiny's Child band members  Beyoncé Knowles and Kelly Rowland in the lobby of an Atlanta hotel. Several months later, a choreographer acquaintance of Williams who knew the group connected Williams to the Knowles family and Rowland, as they were vetting potential new group members.

2000–2003: Breakthrough with Destiny's Child, Heart to Yours and Aida 

After the much-publicized turmoil, Williams, alongside Farrah Franklin, officially joined the group in early 2000, replacing LeToya Luckett and LaTavia Roberson without notice. Buoyed by the group's breakout success, Luckett and Roberson had both attempted to split with the group's manager Mathew Knowles in late 1999, claiming that he kept a disproportionate share of the band's profits and unfairly favored Knowles and Rowland. The issue was heightened after Williams and Franklin appeared in the video of "Say My Name", implying that the original band members were already replaced. Franklin, however, faded from the group after five months, as evidenced by her absences during promotional appearances and concerts. Franklin attributed her departure to negative vibes in the group resulting from the strife. After settling on this final lineup, the trio released "Independent Women Part I", which appeared on the soundtrack to the 2000 film Charlie's Angels. It became their best-charting single yet, topping the official US singles chart for eleven consecutive weeks; the success cemented the new lineup and skyrocketed them to fame.

In May 2001, Destiny's Child released the group's third studio album Survivor. It debuted at number one on the US Billboard 200 with sales of 663,000 copies. Survivor has sold over twelve million copies worldwide, 4.1 million of which were sold in the US alone. The album's other number-one hits are "Bootylicious" and the title track "Survivor", the latter earning the group a Grammy Award for Best R&B Performance by a Duo or Group with Vocals. In October 2001, Destiny's Child released their holiday album, 8 Days of Christmas. Before releasing the 2002 compilation album, This Is the Remix, the group announced their temporary break-up to pursue solo projects.

While Williams was still with Destiny's Child, she intensified work on her debut solo album Heart to Yours. The album material included collaborations with singers Carl Thomas, Shirley Caesar and the Mary Mary duo, taking the singer's work further into urban contemporary gospel and Christian music. "Some people will do gospel when their career fails, but I chose to do it at the height of the popularity of Destiny's Child", Williams explained during the album's release. "And I didn't want to do it because it was a fad. I wanted to do it because it's in me. It's in my heart." Released on April 16, 2002, in North America to much critical acclaim, Williams became the first member of Destiny's Child to release solo material with Heart to Yours. The album sold 20,000 copies in its first week, placing it at number fifty-seven on the Billboard 200 and number two on the Billboard Gospel Albums chart, where it later rose to number one. It became the year's best-selling gospel album, selling more than 220,000 units in the US, as of 2008. A music video for the album's first and only single, "Heard a Word", was produced by film director Sylvain White. Heart to Yours won Williams a MOBO Award for "Best Gospel Act" along with a raft of nominations including a Stellar Award nomination for "New Artist of the Year", a GMWA Excellence Award nomination for "Female Vocalist of the Year Urban Contemporary" and a GMA Dove Award nomination for "Traditional Gospel Recorded Song of the Year" for her collaboration with Shirley Caesar on "Steal Away To Jesus" which was first featured on Caesar's Hymns album. Billboard listed Williams as the fifth Top Gospel Artist of 2002.

In August 2002, Williams embarked on her first tour as a solo artist in promotion of her debut album. Sponsored by Burger King, the 19-date BK Got Music Summer Soul Tour also featured Luther Vandross, Angie Stone and Gerald Levert. Following the release and promotion of Heart to Yours, Williams made her on-stage acting debut in 2003, replacing fellow singer Toni Braxton in the title role of Aida, the hit Broadway musical with music by Elton John and lyrics by Tim Rice. She was the first and remains the only Destiny's Child member to have acted on Broadway.

2004–2007: Destiny's Child's final projects, Do You Know and acting debut 

During the release of her fellow Destiny's Child members' debut albums, Williams spent time in the studio, recording her second album. The album saw her generally re-teaming with the majority of the producers and songwriters from her previous effort, also including Solange Knowles, Dawkins & Dawkins, and brother Erron Williams. However, released on January 26, 2004, in the United States, Do You Know reached a disappointing number one-hundred-and-twenty on the Billboard 200 chart, selling 10,000 copies in its first week despite a warm reception from critics who lent praise to Williams' songwriting ability. Once again, Williams scored more success on the component charts, where the album debuted at number two on the Top Gospel Albums chart and number three on the top Christian Albums tally. The album was later re-released, including previously unreleased songs, to find greater success but did not re-chart; its same-titled lead single also failed to chart. As of March 2008, Do You Know has sold 78,000 copies in the US.

After a three-year hiatus, Destiny's Child reunited for Destiny Fulfilled, released in November 2004. The album hit number two on the Billboard 200, and spawned the singles "Lose My Breath", "Soldier", "Girl" and "Cater 2 U". In support of the album, Destiny's Child embarked on a 2005 Destiny Fulfilled ... And Lovin' It world tour, which started in April to September of the same year. On the Barcelona, Spain visit, the group announced their disbandment after their final North American leg would end. In October 2005, the group released a greatest hits compilation album, titled #1's, including their most successful singles alongside three new tracks, including the band's final single "Stand Up for Love", penned by David Foster. Destiny's Child was honored with a star on the Hollywood Walk of Fame in March 2006. They were also recognized as the world's best-selling female group of all time.

Following Destiny's Child's disbandment in early 2006, Williams made her television debut in the UPN comedy Half & Half, where she played the role of Naomi, a record company executive who is HIV positive. Later that year, she appeared as one of the celebrity singers on the FOX reality television show Celebrity Duets, duetting with actors Alfonso Ribeiro and Jai Rodriguez. In April 2006, Williams performed "America the Beautiful" at World Wrestling Entertainment's event WrestleMania 22, which was in her hometown of Chicago. Beginning in April 2007, Williams joined Oprah Winfrey's Chicago-based cast of the hit Broadway musical The Color Purple for its national tour, starting with an extended run at the Cadillac Palace Theatre. Williams described the opportunity as "a dream come true", playing the part of blues singer Shug Avery, which earned her positive reception.

2008–2010: Unexpected, Chicago and label troubles 

In March 2008, Williams announced the release of her third studio album Unexpected on October 7, 2008. A breakaway from the gospel music on her first two solo albums to secular pop/R&B, the album, her first release since the disbanding of Destiny's Child, involves production by Stargate, Rico Love, Wayne Wilkins, and Soulshock and Karlin, among others. In June 2008, Williams released lead single "We Break the Dawn" to universal acclaim from critics who hailed it as "a terrific fusion of European disco and American R&B". The song became her most successful single yet, peaking at number four on the US Hot Dance Club Play chart, topping the US Hot Dance Airplay chart and reaching the top 50 in the UK and top 40 in Hungary — where it also placed on the 2009 year-end chart. In September 2008, "The Greatest" was issued as the second single release to mainstream radio, while "Hello Heartbreak" was catered to dance clubs. "The Greatest" became Williams' second hit on the Billboard dance charts when it peaked at number-one the US Hot Dance Club Songs. Gaining favorable reviews from critics, in October 2008 Unexpected debuted on the US Billboard 200 albums chart at number 42 and number 11 on the US Billboard Top R&B/Hip-Hop Albums chart, with first week sales of 14,618 units. The album also charted internationally, in the UK and Japan.

On July 13, 2009, Williams began a limited six-week engagement at the Cambridge Theatre in Chicago, making her the first African-American to be cast in the West End production of the musical. Her run was extended and Williams continued appearing for three additional weeks for an extended engagement starting August 23 through September 12. On January 12, 2010, it was announced that Michelle had parted ways with her manager Mathew Knowles and Music World Entertainment. On February 8, Williams made a return to Broadway by commencing a seven-week limited engagement in Chicago at the Ambassador Theatre, replacing Ashlee Simpson. In April, it was announced that Williams would extend her limited engagement in Chicago.

In August 2010, it was reported that Williams would be participating on season 8 of the British television dance competition show Strictly Come Dancing, the originator of the global Dancing with the Stars franchise. On the launch show, it was revealed that Williams had been paired with Brendan Cole. They remained in the competition for seven weeks with variable results; on October 23, Ian Waite stood in as her professional partner when Brendan was unable to do so. Williams was eliminated on November 14. In December 2010, Williams joined DJ Martin Jay to become a co-host on Choice FM's Breakfast Show in London for the month, replacing Lucy Ambache who was on maternity leave. On December 15, Williams released the song "Stay for a Minute", a leftover from Unexpected for free digital download via Twitter to celebrate gaining over 100,000 followers.

2011–2014: Acting, label change and Journey to Freedom 
In January 2011, Williams appeared on BBC's popular comedy panel game show Never Mind the Buzzcocks. On February 4, 2011, Williams began a 28-city tour starring in the David E. Talbert stage-play What My Husband Doesn't Know along with Brian J. White, Ann Nesby and Clifton Davis, playing the lead role of Lena Summer. On July 6, 2011, Williams released a buzz single titled "Love Gun", to precede the release of her upcoming fourth solo album, on which she had begun work in 2010. In August, Electronic Giant Beatz released a press release, cover art and a music video teaser for a song featuring Williams titled "On the Run". The song was released in the United Kingdom on November 27, 2011. Furthermore, in December, Ultra Naté released a joint collaboration with Williams titled "Waiting on You" which rose to number eleven on the Billboard Hot Dance Club Songs chart.

On June 7, 2012, it was announced that Williams had been signed to Light Records and was due to release her fourth studio album in 2013. On January 3, 2013, it was announced that Williams would play Sandra in the national tour of the Tony-nominated musical Fela!, beginning January 29 in Washington, D.C. and playing in a total of 16 cities. Destiny's Child released a compilation album titled Love Songs on January 29, which featured the newly recorded song "Nuclear", co-written by Williams.
On February 3, 2013, during Beyoncé's performance at the Super Bowl XLVII halftime show, held at the Mercedes-Benz Superdome in New Orleans, Rowland and Williams joined Knowles on the stage, where the trio performed excerpts from "Bootylicious", "Independent Women", and "Single Ladies (Put a Ring on It)". Rowland and Williams then exited the stage and Knowles ended her performance. On February 21, it was announced that Williams would be starring in her own reality television show, titled My Sister's Keeper produced by E1 Television, to coincide with the release of her fourth studio album.

In December 2013, Beyoncé released her self-titled fifth studio album in which Williams appeared alongside Beyoncé and Kelly Rowland on the song and music video "Superpower". In 2014, Williams became the spokesperson for a Playtex campaign titled Play On Playbook. In April, it was announced that Williams would join the 50-city North American arena tour of Andrew Lloyd Webber's rock opera Jesus Christ Superstar as Mary Magdalene alongside Superstar winner Ben Forster and other recording artists such as Brandon Boyd and JC Chasez. In May 2014, the tour was cancelled before its launch in New Orleans due to poor ticket sales. Furthermore, it was announced that Williams would star as a mentor in an Oxygen reality television competition titled Fix My Choir, alongside fellow contemporary gospel recording artists Deitrick Haddon and Tye Tribbett.

In June 2013, Williams released the lead single from her inspirational fourth album Journey to Freedom, titled "If We Had Your Eyes". The single became her first release to appear on the US Billboard Adult R&B Songs and Hot Gospel Songs charts, peaking at nineteen and twenty-two respectively. Williams reunited with her former Destiny's Child bandmates for the single "Say Yes", which was released a year later and became Williams' first number-one on the US Hot Gospel Songs; additionally charting internationally in the UK, France and Belgium. "Say Yes" spent seven weeks at number one on the Hot Gospel Songs chart and received a nomination for Best Gospel/Inspirational Song at the 2014 Soul Train Music Awards. In September 2014, Journey to Freedom debuted at number twenty-nine on the US Billboard 200, also reaching number seven on the Independent Albums. It also became aa top 10 success on the UK Christian & Gospel Albums chart where it debuted at number 6. Journey to Freedom was nominated for Outstanding Gospel Album (Traditional or Contemporary) at the 46th NAACP Image Awards, while "Say Yes" won Music Video of the Year at the 30th Stellar Awards, where Williams received a total of four nominations and reunited with Knowles and Rowland for a live performance of the song.

2015–present: Continued acting, Checking In, The Masked Singer and upcoming projects

On April 14, 2015, Williams sang for president Barack Obama at the White House. The program titled, The Gospel Tradition: In Performance at the White House was broadcast on June 26, 2015, on PBS stations and simulcast on TV One. In August 2015, Williams reprised the title role in Aida, presented at the St. Louis venue. The following month, she premiered her Believe at Home bedding collection on the EVINE network. In 2016, Williams sang again for Obama at the White House; alongside Yolanda Adams and Kierra Sheard in the program titled BET Presents: Love and Happiness: An Obama Celebration.

In April 2018, Williams reunited with Beyoncé and Kelly Rowland during Beyoncé's headlining set at the Coachella Valley Music and Arts Festival. In late 2018, Williams starred alongside her then-fiancé, Chad Johnson in the OWN reality show, Chad Loves Michelle. Williams also returned to Broadway as Erzulie in the Tony Award-winning revival of Once On This Island on November 30, 2018, leaving in December on doctor's orders. On December 7, 2018, Williams released the pop single "Fearless" on Radiance Music Group. On December 21, it was announced by Deadline Hollywood that Williams would guest star as Diana Ross in an episode of the BET period drama series American Soul, which aired in February 2019. In April 2019, the singer was involved in Beyoncé's documentary Homecoming and homonymous album. Later that year, Williams competed as "Butterfly" in the second season of The Masked Singer. In December 2019, she came back to the stage starring as the Evil Queen for the 10th anniversary of A Snow White Christmas at the Pasadena Civic Auditorium, alongside Neil Patrick Harris and Jared Gertner. 

In November 2020, Williams announced her memoir, Checking In: How Getting Real About Depression Saved My Life–and Can Save Yours, which was released in May 2021. The accompanying podcast, Checking In with Michelle Williams, premiered on streaming services in December 2020, and was nomintated at the 53rd NAACP Image Awards for Outstanding Lifestyle/Self-Help Podcast. On October 29, 2021, Williams costarred in Hallmark's holiday themed TV movie, Christmas in Harmony. In 2022, Williams competed as "Rockhopper" in the third series of the British version of The Masked Singer. She later competed as "Microphone" in the fourth season of The Masked Singer Australia, making her the first celebrity to compete in three versions of the show.  Williams also starred in the  Lifetime movie, Wrath: A Seven Deadly Sins Story, which aired on April 16, 2022.

Artistry

Voice 
Williams can be identified as a soprano. William Ruhlmann of AllMusic commented that she has a "warm, kittenish voice" with the ability to "transform" from "kitten to tiger", belting "with absolute conviction".  GospelMusicCity.com praised her "delicate vocals" and described her "sopralto stylings" as "inimitable", writing that on "Heard a Word" she "demonstrates further versatility in Ella-like fashion". Sal Cinquemani of Slant Magazine also compared her to other singers writing; "Williams's warm vocal recalls both the playful wisps of her R&B contemporaries (Jill Scott, Erykah Badu) and the breathy timbre of Diana Ross" while Emily Sogn of PopMatters wrote "Williams singing style is pleasingly slow paced...that owes a lot to her pop contemporaries like Ashanti and Janet Jackson." Similarly, Mike Rimmer of Cross Rhythms described her voice as "soulful" and Caroline Sullivan of The Guardian wrote that "Williams's strength is a shimmery jazz lilt".

Honors and awards 

Williams has earned an array of awards and honors as a solo artist and a member of Destiny's Child. These include: one Grammy Award and one MOBO Award. Billboard ranked Williams as the fifth Top Gospel Artist of 2002 due to the success of her debut release Heart to Yours which was one of the best-selling gospel releases of the year. In 2013, Williams was honored in her hometown of Rockford, Illinois at the 2013 I Love Gospel Music honors luncheon, which featured musical tributes, including one by Sunday Best winner Amber Bullock.

Personal life 
Williams reportedly began dating pastor and professional sports chaplain Chad Johnson in July 2017. Williams and Johnson announced their engagement via People on April 19, 2018. In September 2018, the couple revealed plans to film a television series, showcasing their relationship as they navigate the road from engagement to marriage. On November 3, 2018, the reality show Chad Loves Michelle began airing on the Oprah Winfrey Network. In December 2018, Williams announced that she and Johnson had both called off their engagement.

Mental health 
Williams has a history of depression, saying that she has "been suffering since the ages of 13 and 15". During her time with Destiny's Child, she says that she told their then manager Mathew Knowles about her feelings, but that he did not really understand. He replied to her concerns by trying to point out the good side of their new-found fame, "You all just signed a multi-millionaire dollar deal, you're about to go on tour, what have you got to be depressed about?" She said that she had difficulty understanding her own feelings until later in life, around her thirties, stating that "I didn't know until I was in my 30s what was going on, I just thought it was growing pains, I just thought I'm turning into a woman." She also felt that Knowles intended no malice, and only had her best interests at heart, "Bless his heart... I think he wanted me to be grateful, which I was, but I was still sad."

Williams again felt helpless after she and her fiancé, Chad Johnson, split up in late 2018. She said the breakup left her "shattered and ... fighting suicidal thoughts." She said that she felt "so angry. The rage built up in me. I did not attempt suicide, but I was questioning [life]". Williams suffered a nervous breakdown just after opening day for a Broadway production of Once on This Island and was advised to leave the show by her doctor. By April 2020 she had returned to better health, saying that "I am in a better place now. I am not perfect. I'm not preaching ... When people say it gets better, it does. It just takes time. The days do get brighter".

Memoir 
In November 2020, Williams announced plans to release a memoir "revealing her entire truth including a deeper dive into where her anxiety and depression came from." She stated, "I'm ready to share, I've been a very transparent person and now I'm ready to share the good, bad, and ugly parts of my journey—the concerning part of my journey. ... I really go into the specifics, I really go into the first time I was diagnosed, I go into assessing the first time I had anxiety in a romantic relationship and what it did to that relationship and then subsequently what it did to the next one." Williams said she hoped to "really help heal through my story" and "let people know what I do on a daily, what I do on a monthly–whatever it takes to get people whole and get people where they can maybe start seeing some better results in their own life."

The book titled Checking In: How Getting Real about Depression Saved My Life—and Can Save Yours was published on May 25, 2021.

Philanthropy 
In 2001, Williams made a "bountiful" donation of $148,900 to her church, St. Paul Church of God in Christ in Rockford, Illinois – of which she has been a member since birth – to finish construction of the church's school, St. Paul Academy. The church is pastored by her uncle, Bishop James E. Washington.

In 2005, music producer David Foster, his daughter Amy Foster-Gillies, and Knowles wrote "Stand Up for Love", which would serve as the anthem of World Children's Day, an event which takes place annually around the world on November 20 to raise awareness and funds for children's causes worldwide. Destiny's Child lent their voices and support as global ambassadors for the 2005 World Children's Day program. In this role, Knowles, Rowland and Williams visited Ronald McDonald Houses around the world during their Destiny Fulfilled... and Lovin' It World Tour and donated a portion of their North American ticket sales to Ronald McDonald House Charities.

On September 19, 2006, Williams jump-started the Chicago PepsiCo S.M.A.R.T. – which stands for five simple steps that encourage active living and better food choices – program to promote active, healthy lifestyles by building a new "Smart Spot" playground in Chicago. Williams, along with friend Lance Bass, was on hand to sing to and greet kids at the opening of Camp Heartland, a camp dedicated to helping kids suffering from HIV/AIDS enjoy life and take their mind off their illness. Furthermore, in 2006, the Chicago Sky, a team in the Women's National Basketball Association, announced that Williams, along with Mathew Knowles, is part of a group of minority shareholder owners in the team.

In 2012, she became an ambassador for the American Heart Association's Power to End Stroke campaign. In speaking of her role she said "I am honored to partner with the campaign ... my father had a stroke in 2005 due to smoking, diabetes and an unhealthy diet, and my grandmother was diagnosed with having a stroke in 2006 when she went to her doctor for a simple outpatient procedure. I am bringing awareness to people so that strokes can be prevented. Let's take care of ourselves...the first step is knowledge about your health."

In 2014, Williams partnered with Hyundai's non-profit organization, Hope on Wheels, "committed to finding a cure for childhood cancer"; which has raised over $74,000,000 for the cause since its inception in 1998.

Discography 

Studio albums
 Heart to Yours (2002)
 Do You Know (2004)
 Unexpected (2008)
 Journey to Freedom (2014)

with Destiny's Child

 Survivor (2001)
 8 Days of Christmas (2001)
 Destiny Fulfilled (2004)

Filmography

References

External links 

 
 
 
 
 

1979 births
Living people
20th-century American singers
20th-century Christians
21st-century American singers
21st-century Christians
Actors from Rockford, Illinois
Actresses from Illinois
African-American actresses
African-American Christians
African-American women singer-songwriters
American dance musicians
American expatriates in the United Kingdom
American women pop singers
American women singer-songwriters
American film actresses
American gospel singers
American musical theatre actresses
American Pentecostals
American performers of Christian music
American contemporary R&B singers
American television actresses
Chicago Sky owners
Destiny's Child members
Feminist musicians
Gold Star Records artists
Grammy Award winners
Illinois State University alumni
Members of the Church of God in Christ
Musicians from Rockford, Illinois
Participants in American reality television series
Singer-songwriters from Illinois
20th-century American women singers
21st-century American women singers